The Wahpeton–Breckenridge Twins were a minor league baseball team based in Wahpeton, North Dakota and Breckenridge, Minnesota. In 1921 and 1922, the Twins played as members of the Class D level Dakota League, having been preceded by the 1897 Wahpeton–Breckenridge Methodists.

History
The Twins began minor league play in 1921 and caused a change in the league name. The South Dakota League changed names to become the "Dakota League", after adding the Wahpeton–Breckenridge Twins franchise, based in neighboring border cities in North Dakota and Minnesota.

Baseball play on Sunday had been illegal in North Dakota until the law was repealed in 1920, a positive for early professional teams, who needed the revenue from Sunday crowds to be financially viable. Wahpeton, North Dakota newspaper publisher Robert J. Hughes formed the new Wahpeton–Breckenridge franchise, hiring Roy Patterson as manager.

The 1921 Dakota League remained an eight–team Class D level league, with 13–player rosters for each team. The Twins joined the  Aberdeen Grays, Huron Packers, Madison Greys, Mitchell Kernels, Redfield Red Sox, Sioux Falls Soos and Watertown Cubs in beginning league play on May 20, 1921.

In their first season of play, the Twins ended the season in 3rd place. With a record of 55–43, the Twins finished 10.5 games behind the 1st place Mitchell Kernels in the final standings. Roy Patterson managed the Twins.

The Twins played their final season in 1922. The Dakota League continued play as an eight–team Class D level league, adding the Fargo Athletics, Jamestown Jimkotans and Valley City Hi-Liners as new league franchises. The Wahpeton–Breckenridge Twins, Aberdeen Grays, Mitchell Kernels, Sioux Falls Soos and Watertown Cubs returned as members.

With a record of 42–55, playing under returning manager Roy Patterson, the Twins finished in 7th place. Mitchell defended their championship and ended the 1922 season with a 60–37 record to finish 18.0 games ahead of the Twins in the final standings.

The Twins did not return to play in 1923, as the Dakota League split into two four–team partner leagues to condense travel. The new 1923 leagues were called the North Dakota League and South Dakota League.

Wahpeton–Breckenridge has not hosted another minor league team.

The ballpark
The name and location of the home minor league ballpark for the Wahpeton–Breckenridge Twins is not directly referenced. Chahinkapa Park in Wahpeton was in use in the era, having been purchased from the Federal Government in 1903. Coincidently, the Twins' owner, Robert J. Hughes was the director of the park, which evolved to host a zoo.

Timeline

Year–by–year records

Notable alumni

Roy Patterson (1921, MGR)

References

External links
Breckenridge - Baseball Reference

Professional baseball teams in North Dakota
Defunct baseball teams in North Dakota
Baseball teams established in 1921
Baseball teams disestablished in 1922
Defunct baseball teams in Minnesota
Wahpeton, North Dakota
Wilkin County, Minnesota
Dakota League teams